Kollam Assembly Constituency is a legislative assembly constituency in the South Indian state of Kerala. It is one among the 11 assembly constituencies in Kollam district. As of the 2021 assembly elections, the current MLA is Mukesh of CPI(M).

Structure of the constituency

Kollam Assembly Constituency includes 19 wards of Kollam City Corporation (Kureepuzha West, Kureepuzha, Neeravil, Anchalumoodu, Kadavoor, Mathilil, Thevally, Vadakkumbhagam, Uliyakovil East, Kadappakada, Koickal, Kallumthazham, Mundakkal, Pattathanam, Cantonment, Udayamarthandapuram, Thamarakkulam, Pallithottam, Port Kollam) along with the neighbouring panchayaths of Panayam and Thrikkaruva, as per the recent changes on assembly constituency delimitations.

Major institutions in the constituency

 Corporations: 1 (Kollam)
 Panchayaths: 2 (Panayam; Thrikkaruva)
 Railway stations: 1 (Kollam Junction)
 Bus stations: 3 (Kollam KSRTC Bus Station; Andamukkam City Bus Stand; Tangasseri Bus Terminal)
 Government hospitals: 2 (Govt. District Hospital, Kollam; Community Health Center in Thrikkadavoor)
 RTOs: 1 (Kollam city)

Electoral history

Travancore-Cochin Legislative Assembly Elections

Members of Legislative Assembly 
The following list contains all members of Kerala legislative assembly who have represented the constituency:

Key

Election results 
Percentage change (±%) denotes the change in the number of votes from the immediate previous election.

Niyamasabha Election 2021 
There were 1,76,041 registered voters in the constituency for the 2021 Kerala Niyamasabha Election.

Niyamasabha Election 2016 
There were 1,72,552 registered voters in the constituency for the 2016 Kerala Niyamasabha Election.

Niyamasabha Election 2011 
There were 1,60,475 registered voters in the constituency for the 2011 election.

List of Kerala Ministers from Kollam constituency

References

Assembly constituencies of Kerala
Government of Kollam
Politics of Kollam district
Assembly constituencies in Kollam district
1951 establishments in Travancore–Cochin